Beenleigh–Redland Bay Road is a continuous  road route in the Logan and Redland local government areas of Queensland, Australia. The route is designated as part of State Route 47. It is a state-controlled district road (number 108) rated as a local road of regional significance (LRRS).

Route description
Starting at the western service road to the Pacific Motorway, it runs north-east under the motorway before turning east. It passes the exit to Bryants Road as it enters . It then turns south-east, following the north side of the Logan River through .

On entering  the road turns north-east and its name changes to Longland Road. It then turns north as Serpentine Creek Road. Continuing north it reaches an intersection where Serpentine Creek Road exits to the north-east and State Route 47 turns north-west as Cleveland–Redland Bay Road. This is the eastern end of Beenleigh–Redland Bay Road.

Land use along the road is mainly rural, with the exception of the short residential section through the southern tip of Cornubia.

Road condition
The road is fully sealed, with a short section of four-lane dual carriageway. A project to signalise the intersection with Kruger Road and to improve associated roadworks, at a cost of $23.85 million, was completed in November 2021. Kruger Road provides access to several schools in Carbrook.

A project to plan for a future upgrade of a  section at Cornubia will be undertaken in the 2022-23 and 2023-24 financial years.

History

Farming had begun along the north bank of the Logan River by the 1860s, with a cotton gin, later converted to a sugar mill, built in Loganholme in 1867. Carbrook was settled by German immigrants in 1868. This may have resulted in many small farms along the river and the development of a road to enable access by wheeled vehicles.

The Redland Bay region was settled from the 1860s, first by timber cutters and then by farmers. Cotton was the first crop, but was unsuccessful and soon replaced by sugar cane. The first roads from north to south may have been made by timber cutters to enable transport of their product to market. In time the north-south road would have been linked to the west-east road from Loganholme, resulting in the forerunner of the Beenleigh-Redland Bay Road that exists today.

Coomera Connector

Major intersections
All distances are from Google Maps.

See also

 List of road routes in Queensland
 List of numbered roads in Queensland

Notes

References

Roads in Queensland